Herrsching station is a railway station on the Munich S-Bahn in the town of Herrsching am Ammersee in the southwest area of Munich, Germany. It is served by the S-Bahn line .

Notable places nearby
Ammersee

References

Munich S-Bahn stations
Railway stations in Bavaria
Railway stations in Germany opened in 1903
1903 establishments in Bavaria
Buildings and structures in Starnberg (district)